Flajolet is a surname. Notable people with the surname include:

André Flajolet (born 1946), French politician
Philippe Flajolet (1948–2011), French computer scientist